Oued Guir is an intermittent river or wadi that flows through the Drâa-Tafilalet and Oriental regions in southeastern Morocco and Béchar Province in western Algeria.

Course

Here it meets the Beni Yal and Oued Zelmou and turns south to the border with Algeria. After entering Algeria, the river enters the Djorf Torba dam, the continues past Abadla to Igli, where it merges with the Oued Zouzfana to form the Oued Saoura.

References

Guir
Guir
Geography of Béchar Province
Geography of Oriental (Morocco)
Geography of Drâa-Tafilalet
Guir